The United States ambassador to Saint Kitts and Nevis (or, prior to 3 August 1988, to Saint Christopher and Nevis) is the official representative of the government of the United States to the government of Saint Kitts and Nevis. The title of the ambassador is United States Ambassador to Barbados and the Eastern Caribbean and is concurrently the ambassador to Antigua and Barbuda, Barbados, Dominica, Grenada, St. Lucia, and St. Vincent and the Grenadines.

The United States established diplomatic relations with Saint Christopher and Nevis on 20 September 1983, but no U.S. mission has ever been established at Basseterre. After 25 June 1988, all relations were handled by the Embassy at St. John's, Antigua and Barbuda. When that Embassy closed on 30 June 1994, all diplomatic functions have been handled out of the U.S. Embassy at Bridgetown, Barbados, where the U.S. Ambassador to Saint Kitts and Nevis is resident.

List of U.S. ambassadors to Saint Kitts and Nevis
The following is a list of U.S. ambassadors, or other chiefs of mission, to Saint Kitts and Nevis. The title given by the United States State Department to this position is currently Ambassador Extraordinary and Plenipotentiary.

See also
Saint Kitts and Nevis – United States relations
Foreign relations of Saint Kitts and Nevis
Ambassadors of the United States

References

United States Department of State: Background notes on Saint Knitts and Nevis

External links
 United States Department of State: Chiefs of Mission for Saint Kitts and Nevis
 United States Department of State: Saints Kitts and Nevis
 United States Embassy in Bridgetown

 01
United States
Saint Kitts and Nevis
Saint Kitts and Nevis